Timothy Mulenga Sapato is a Zambian lawyer, author, and social justice activist. He has written three books; The Pain of an African Woman, The Dawn of Young Leadership, and Awake for Governance which won the Zambian National Non-Fiction book of the year in May 2019.

He previously served as Students Union President of the National Institute of Public Administration [NIPA] from 2017-2018.

Honors 
In 2020, Sapato was named among the top 30 most outstanding youths in Zambia, by the Ministry of Youth and Sports through the National Youth Development Council [NYDC] and conferred with a 'Governance Accomplishment Award' for exhibiting exceptional leadership skills.

In May 2019, Concept Developers Initiative [CDI] in conjunction with the Ministry of Tourism and Arts awarded him as 2019 Best Non-Fiction Book Author Award through his first publication [Awake for Governance] book.

In 2022, he was invited as one of the Judges at the Miss Secondary School grand finale held at Lusaka's Government Complex.

References

External links

Living people
Year of birth missing (living people)
Zambian writers
Zambian activists
Zambian lawyers